Düsseldorf-Angermund station is a station on the Cologne–Duisburg railway in the Düsseldorf district of Angermund in the German state of North Rhine Westphalia. It is served by line S 1 of the Rhine-Ruhr S-Bahn.

Location 
The station is situated in the village at the intersection of the Cologne–Duisburg railway, which runs north–south, with Angermunder Straße (L 139). This is the main street of the village and crosses the rail tracks at right angles on a bridge above the station. Bahnhofstrasse (station street) also run from the east about 100 metres further south. On the western side of the line its alignment is continued by the street of An den Linden (beside the linden trees).

Infrastructure 
The station has an island platform which is arranged centrally below the bridge and is located on the two western tracks of the four-track line. Access is at the southern end of the platform by means of an underpass that connects to both Bahnhofstrasse and An den Linden. The southern half of the platform is covered.

There is a bus stop in Bahnhofstrasse and on the west side there is a parking lot with about 70 parking spaces.

Transport services 
The station is served by Rhine-Ruhr S-Bahn line S 1 (Dortmund–Solingen) every 30 minutes during the day on week days between Essen and Düsseldorf. It is also connected to the west by bus route 751.

References

Railway stations in Düsseldorf
Rhine-Ruhr S-Bahn stations
S1 (Rhine-Ruhr S-Bahn)
Railway stations in Germany opened in 1880
Railway stations in Germany opened in 1897